Aaron Templeton Mitchell, Jr. (born December 15, 1956) is a former professional American football cornerback in the National Football League for the Dallas Cowboys and the Tampa Bay Buccaneers. He played college football at the University of Nevada, Las Vegas.

Early years
Mitchell attended North Hollywood High School, before moving on to College of the Canyons for two years.

He transferred to the University of Nevada, Las Vegas, where he was the starter at right cornerback for the following two years. As a senior, he registered 6 interceptions and 12 passes defensed.

In 1989, he was inducted into the UNLV Athletics Hall of Fame.

Professional career

Dallas Cowboys
The Dallas Cowboys liked Mitchell's athletic ability and selected him in the second round (55th overall) of the 1979 NFL Draft. In 1980, he became the starter at right cornerback, replacing Aaron Kyle and recording 3 interceptions. In 1981, he was passed on the depth chart by Dennis Thurman and was traded to the Tampa Bay Buccaneers in exchange for an eleventh draft choice (#295-George Thompson).

Tampa Bay Buccaneers
The Buccaneers moved him to free safety to take advantage of his aggressive hitting and to limit his exposure in coverage. He was placed on injured reserve list for the last two games of the season, after suffering a collapsed lung. He was released before the start of the 1982 season.

Arizona Wranglers (USFL)
In 1983, he signed with the Arizona Wranglers of the USFL.

Los Angeles Express (USFL)
In 1984, he played with the Los Angeles Express of the USFL, until announcing his retirement in 1985.

Personal life
He is currently a financial adviser.

References

External links
From Cougar to Cowboy: Aaron Mitchell Leads the Way

1956 births
Living people
Players of American football from Los Angeles
American football cornerbacks
College of the Canyons Cougars football players
UNLV Rebels football players
Dallas Cowboys players
Tampa Bay Buccaneers players
Arizona Wranglers players
Los Angeles Express players
North Hollywood High School alumni